The women's 4 × 100 metre freestyle relay competition of the swimming events at the 2013 Mediterranean Games took place on June 21 at the Mersin Olympic Swimming Pool in Mersin, Turkey. Italy is the defending champion from the 2009 Mediterranean Games.

The race consisted of eight lengths of the pool. Each of the four swimmers completes two lengths of the pool. The first swimmer has to touch the wall before the second leaves the starting block.

Records
Prior to this competition, the existing world and Mediterranean Games records were as follows:

Results
All times are in minutes and seconds.

References

Swimming at the 2013 Mediterranean Games
2013 in women's swimming